Valentyna Tarakanova (born 28 May 1996) is a Ukrainian footballer who plays as forward for the AP Orlen Gdańsk in the polish Ekstraliga and for the Ukraine women's national team.

References

1996 births
Living people
Ukrainian women's footballers
Women's association football forwards
Ukraine women's international footballers
Ukrainian expatriate sportspeople in Poland